Däniken can mean:

 A Swiss author Erich von Däniken
 Däniken, Solothurn, a municipality of Switzerland

See also
 Dänikon, a municipality of the canton of Zürich, Switzerland